Oeax triangularis is a species of beetle in the family Cerambycidae. It was described by White in 1858.

References

Ancylonotini
Beetles described in 1858